Evmoiro is a community in the municipality of Xanthi, northern Greece. It consists of the settlements Evmoiro, Kallithea, Lamprino, Lefki, Nea Morsini, Palaia Morsini and Petrochori. 

Populated places in Xanthi (regional unit)